Frances Rutherford (29 April 1912 – 22 November 2006) was a New Zealand artist and occupational therapist.

Early life 
A daughter of Alethea Mary Robinson and her husband Charles William Rutherford, a cousin of nuclear physicist Ernest Rutherford, she was born in 1912, in Masterton, New Zealand. 

Rutherford was disabled by poliomyelitis at the age of ten. Although she left secondary education without qualifications she enrolled in the Canterbury College of Fine Arts (now Ilam School of Fine Arts) at the age of 26, and graduated with a diploma.

She attempted to train as an occupational therapist in New Zealand but was turned down due to her disability. However, she travelled to the UK to attend the Liverpool School of Occupational Therapy, at the University of Liverpool, graduating in 1952.

Career 
Following graduation, Rutherford returned to her home town of Masterton and worked as an artist and occupational therapist. In 1955 she was appointed deputy principal of the New Zealand School of Occupational Therapy in Auckland. Due to the lack of training opportunities in New Zealand she returned to the United Kingdom in 1957 to obtain a post-graduate diploma in education, specialising in occupational therapy. 

Rutherford took over as the principal of the School of Occupational Therapy in 1959 following the resignation of Hazel Skilton. Building on the work of the previous two principals, she developed the school's curriculum and was instrumental in gaining recognition for occupational therapy in New Zealand.

After her retirement in 1972 Rutherford documented the history of the school, completing the document in 1976.

Artistic work 
Works by Rutherford include My View No. 8 (Auckland Harbour).

Exhibitions 
Rutherford exhibited with the Auckland Society of Arts and at the New Visions Gallery, including the Nikau Palms exhibition in 1967.

Frances Rutherford Lecture Award 
In 1983 the Occupational Therapy New Zealand/Whakaora Ngangahau Aotearoa established the Frances Rutherford Lecture Award in her honour. The award is presented biennially at the Occupational Therapy New Zealand/Whakaora Ngangahau Aotearoa Conference and showcases outstanding role models and best practice for occupational therapists in New Zealand.

References

Further reading 
Artist files for Rutherford are held at:
 E. H. McCormick Research Library, Auckland Art Gallery Toi o Tāmaki
 Fine Arts Library, University of Auckland
 Hocken Collections Uare Taoka o Hākena
 Te Aka Matua Research Library, Museum of New Zealand Te Papa Tongarewa

1912 births
2006 deaths
New Zealand painters
New Zealand women painters
Alumni of the University of Liverpool
Ilam School of Fine Arts alumni
Occupational therapists
People from Masterton
People associated with the Museum of New Zealand Te Papa Tongarewa
People associated with the Auckland Society of Arts